Jorge Marcelino Agirrezabala Ibarbia, nicknamed Chirri I (29 March 1902 – 31 May 1975) was a Spanish footballer who played as a forward. He competed for Spain in the men's tournament at the 1924 Summer Olympics.

At club level, he played for Athletic Bilbao for seven seasons in the era prior to the introduction of La Liga; he won the Copa del Rey in 1923, as well as several editions of the regional Biscay Championship.

His younger brother Ignacio, known as Chirri II, also played for Athletic Bilbao and Spain; the siblings both played in one friendly match but never took the field together in a competitive fixture.

References

External links

Chirri I at SE Fútbol

1902 births
1975 deaths
Spanish footballers
Spain international footballers
Olympic footballers of Spain
Footballers at the 1924 Summer Olympics
Footballers from Bilbao
Association football forwards
Athletic Bilbao footballers
Basque Country international footballers
SD Erandio Club players